Unsaturated rhamnogalacturonyl hydrolase (YteR, YesR) is an enzyme with systematic name 2-O-(4-deoxy-beta-L-threo-hex-4-enopyranuronosyl)-alpha-L-rhamnopyranose hydrolase. This enzyme catalyses the following chemical reaction

 2-O-(4-deoxy-beta-L-threo-hex-4-enopyranuronosyl)-alpha-L-rhamnopyranose + H2O  5-dehydro-4-deoxy-D-glucuronate + L-rhamnopyranose

The enzyme is part of the degradation system for rhamnogalacturonan I in Bacillus subtilis strain 168.

References

External links 
 

EC 3.2.1